Petrushi is the name of several rural localities in Russia:
Petrushi (selo), Amur Oblast, a selo in Petrushinsky Selsoviet of Shimanovsky District, Amur Oblast
Petrushi (station), Amur Oblast, a station in Petrushinsky Selsoviet of Shimanovsky District, Amur Oblast